Kolvereid Church is a parish church of the Church of Norway in Nærøysund municipality in Trøndelag county, Norway. It is located in the town of Kolvereid. It is the one of the churches for the Nærøy parish which is part of the Namdal prosti (deanery) in the Diocese of Nidaros. The white, wooden church was built in a long church style in 1874 using plans drawn up by the architect Jacob Wilhelm Nordan. The church seats about 350 people.

History
The earliest existing historical records of the church date back to the year 1597, but the church was not new that year. The first church at Kolvereid was a small chapel that was likely built during the 15th century. Records show that in the late 1500s, the chapel typically had two worship services each year. In 1656 the little old chapel was torn down and a new wooden long church was built on the same site. This new wooden church was consecrated in 1658. In 1811, the old church was heavily renovated and expanded, nearly doubling the size of the church. After the new church was put into use, the old church was taken down and moved to Bogen where it became known as Opløyfjorden Chapel (and later it was taken down again and moved to Lund where it is known as Lund Chapel).

See also
List of churches in Nidaros

References

Nærøysund
Churches in Trøndelag
Long churches in Norway
Wooden churches in Norway
19th-century Church of Norway church buildings
Churches completed in 1874
15th-century establishments in Norway